Sarah Jordan may refer to:

People
Sass Jordan, Sarah "Sass" Jordan, British -born Canadian rock artist
Sarah Jordan (motorcycle racer), 2010 British Supersport Championship season

Fictional characters
Sarah Jordan, character in Helix (TV series)
Sarah Jordan, character in The Island (2005 film)
Sarah Jordan, character in Beyond Borders